Dothan Civic Center is a 3,100-seat multi-purpose arena located in Dothan, Alabama.

It hosts local sporting events and concerts. Ultimate Fighting Championship 12 was held at Dothan Civic Center.

Recently (November. 10, 2018), actor and comedian Rodney Carrington performed.

Sports venues in Alabama
Indoor arenas in Alabama
Sports in Dothan, Alabama